Richard Simon Sharp (born 8 February 1956) is an English former banker who has been the chairman of the BBC since February 2021. Sharp worked at JP Morgan for eight years, and then for 23 years at Goldman Sachs. Broadcaster Jonathan Dimbleby  said he had been criticised for helping Boris Johnson secure an £800,000 loan during his tenure as Prime Minister and for not disclosing this during the appointment process at the BBC. He used to be the boss of the current UK Prime Minister, Rishi Sunak at Goldman Sachs. He has donated more than £400,000 to the Conservative Party.

Immediately before coming to the BBC, Sharp served as chairman of the Royal Academy of Arts (2007–2012) and as a member of the Bank of England's Financial Policy Committee (2013–2019).

Commentators had observed that his relationship with Rishi Sunak would probably help him to lead negotiations with the government over the future of the BBC's licence fee.

Early life
Richard Sharp was born on 8 February 1956, to a Jewish family in London. He is the son of Eric Sharp, Baron Sharp of Grimsdyke, who was chairman of Cable & Wireless plc from 1980 to 1990. His twin sister, Dame Victoria Sharp, is president of the King's Bench Division of the High Court in England and Wales.

In 1978, he received a degree in philosophy, politics, and economics from Christ Church, Oxford.

Career
Sharp worked for JP Morgan for eight years. He then worked for Goldman Sachs for 23 years, rising to chairman of its principal investment business in Europe, before leaving in 2007. He was Rishi Sunak's boss when they both worked for Goldman Sachs, was an advisor to Boris Johnson when he was Mayor of London, and acted as an unpaid adviser to Sunak on the UK's economic response to the COVID-19 pandemic. He was a member of the Bank of England's Financial Policy Committee from 2013 to 2019. In 2014, he joined the property investment company RoundShield Partners, where he was a senior member until February 2021, when The Guardian approached the firm for comment. RoundShield advised and managed a fund that provided a £50m loan to Caridon Property, which has been accused of "cramming homeless and low-income families into former office blocks".

Sharp was chairman of the Royal Academy of Arts from 2007 to 2012.

BBC chairmanship
In January 2021 it was announced that he would be the next chairman of the BBC, succeeding David Clementi who was due to leave the position the following month. Speaking shortly after his appointment, Sharp told the Digital, Culture, Media and Sport Committee that he planned to give his £160,000 BBC salary to charity.

Conservative donations and political controversy
The Guardian reported that Sharp had donated more than £400,000 to the Conservative Party and that he was a former director of the Centre for Policy Studies, a think tank created by Margaret Thatcher in the 1970s with historical links to the Conservative Party. The appointment followed that of Tim Davie, a former Conservative Party council candidate, to the role of Director-General. Professor Diane Coyle, formerly of the BBC Trust, stated in January 2023 that Sharp should never have even been on the selection panel.

In January 2023, The Sunday Times reported that just weeks before Sharp was announced as BBC chairman, he helped the then Prime Minister, Boris Johnson, secure an £800,000 loan. Sharp helped connect Johnson with Sam Blyth, a multimillionaire Canadian businessman and one of Johnson's distant cousins, who acted as a guarantor. Sharp did not disclose any involvement with Johnson's financial arrangements during the interview process, nor at a hearing before a select committee. He acknowledged that he "connected" Johnson and Blyth but denied that this was a conflict of interest. Replying to a question about this from Sky News, Johnson said that Sharp knew nothing about his personal finances.

Following the story, the Labour Party called for an investigation into Sharp's appointment as chair of the BBC and suggested that the Prime Minister had breached the code of conduct. The accusations have been dismissed by the Cabinet Office via a spokesperson and members of the government have maintained that Sharp was hired on merit. The Board of the BBC is reviewing potential conflicts of interest, but Sharp has stated that he will not quit his position.

Writing in The Guardian on 24 January 2023, Roger Bolton  drew parallels with the controversy over the appointment by the Tony Blair Labour government, of Gavyn Davies as chairman of the BBC in 2001. Bolton described him as having been both a member of, and donor to, the Labour Party, and "also a multimillionaire", and as "a former partner at Goldman Sachs", and his wife was a "private secretary to the prime minister". Bolton also described how the director general under Davies, Greg Dyke, had also been a Labour Party member and donor. Roger Mosey stated restoring trust in BBC impartiality should involve ending political appointments to the chairmanship. Mosey maintained "All governments have done it."

The Office of the Commissioner for Public Appointments opened an inquiry into this appointment. On 6 February 2023 the Commissioner recused himself as he had "met Sharp on several occasions", and appointed Adam Heppinstall to lead further work.

Sharp's failure to tell the Digital, Culture, Media and Sport Committee of his discussions was examined at their meeting on 7 February 2023. The Committee concluded that this omission prevented appropriate scrutiny. The cross-party committee stated Sharp failed to provide "the full facts we required to make an informed judgment on his suitability as a candidate. Mr Sharp should consider the impact his omissions will have on trust in him, the BBC and the public appointments process". Labour MP Lucy Powell feared the report put the impartiality and independence of the BBC into doubt and criticised "cronyism", while Liberal Democrat MP Daisy Cooper called for the ministerial ethics adviser to investigate Johnson. 

The broadcaster Jonathan Dimbleby said Sharp should "fall on his sword" due the criticism he had faced and added the trouble was causing a "great deal of damage for the BBC". Journalist Patience Wheatcroft commented on the loan to Johnson that Sharp helped to organise and said Sharp did Johnson "a favour just when he wanted the prime minister to give him the top job at the BBC.(...) What the BBC needs in a chairman is impeccable judgment." In Declassified UK, former Guardian defence correspondent Richard Norton-Taylor said: "The Sharp affair is the latest episode in a long history of the close relationship between the BBC and the upper reaches of the British establishment."

Gary Lineker controversy
In response to the suspension of Match of the Day presenter Gary Lineker by the BBC several politicians and other political commentators called for Sharp's resignation. Labour leader Keir Starmer described Sharp's position as "increasingly untenable", while Mark Ruskell, the culture spokesperson for the Scottish Greens, said: "Richard Sharp must go and go now. Every second he remains trust in the BBC's ability to carry out its functions free from UK Government influence is eroded." Ed Davey, Leader of the Liberal Democrats, called on Sunak to "do the right thing and sack Richard Sharp."

Personal life
In 1987, Richard Sharp married Victoria Hull, an American and fellow Goldman Sachs banker, in Connecticut. They have three children together. In October 2008, the couple were living in Kensington, and had an estimated net worth of £500 million. They divorced, and some time after 2014, Hull married British investment banker Sir Simon Robey. Sharp also has a daughter from a second marriage that has also ended.

Sharp has given more than £400,000 to the Conservative Party, and £35,000 to the Quilliam think tank via his charity, the Sharp Foundation. When asked why he donated to Quilliam, Sharp said he was impressed by founder Maajid Nawaz's "efforts to combat radicalism and extremism".

References

1956 births
Living people
British bankers
Goldman Sachs people
Sons of life peers
Alumni of Christ Church, Oxford
BBC people
Chairmen of the BBC
BBC Board members
JPMorgan Chase people
Conservative Party (UK) donors